Filip Barović (born 29 July 1990) is a Montenegrin professional basketball player for Rapid București of the Romanian League. 

Barović played for Budućnost VOLI.

References

External links
 Filip Barović at aba-liga.com
 Filip Barović at fiba.com
 Filip Barović at eurobasket.com
 Filip Barović at euroleague.net

1990 births
Living people
Centers (basketball)
Montenegrin expatriate basketball people in Germany
Kecskeméti TE (basketball) players
KK Budućnost players
KK Mornar Bar players
KK Studentski centar players
Montenegrin expatriate basketball people in Bulgaria
Montenegrin expatriate sportspeople in Germany
Montenegrin expatriate basketball people in Hungary
Montenegrin men's basketball players
PBC Academic players
Power forwards (basketball)
Soproni KC players
Sportspeople from Nikšić
Telekom Baskets Bonn players